Sonny Rollins on Impulse! is an album by jazz saxophonist Sonny Rollins, his first to be released on the Impulse! label, featuring performances by Rollins with Ray Bryant, Walter Booker and Mickey Roker.

Reception

The Allmusic review by Thom Jurek states: "This date is significant for the manner in which Rollins attacks five standards with a quartet.... Sonny Rollins on Impulse! feels as if it were a recording Rollins had to get out of his system. But thank goodness for us because it's a winner through and through."

Track listing
 "On Green Dolphin Street" (Bronislaw Kaper, Ned Washington) – 7:10
 "Everything Happens to Me" (Tom Adair, Matt Dennis) – 11:14
 "Hold 'Em Joe" (Harry Thomas) – 5:30
 "The Blue Room" (Lorenz Hart, Richard Rodgers) – 3:44
 "Three Little Words" (Bert Kalmar, Harry Ruby) – 6:56
Recorded at Van Gelder Studio, Englewood Cliffs, NJ, on July 8, 1965

Personnel
Sonny Rollins – tenor saxophone
Ray Bryant – piano 
Walter Booker – bass
Mickey Roker – drums

References

1965 albums
Impulse! Records albums
Sonny Rollins albums
Albums recorded at Van Gelder Studio
Albums produced by Bob Thiele